Roger Dean may refer to:

Roger Dean (artist) (born 1944)
Roger Dean (Australian politician) (1913–1998)
Roger Dean (footballer) (born 1940), Australian rules footballer
Roger Dean (guitar player) (born 1943), British guitar player and teacher
Roger Dean (musician) (born 1948), British-Australian jazz pianist
Roger Dean Stadium, baseball stadium, Florida
 Roger Kingsley Dean, jailed for the 2011 Quakers Hill Nursing Home Fire in which 11 died

See also